Sri Aandal is a 1948 Indian Tamil-language Hindu mythological film directed by Velsamy Kavi. Based on Andal, it stars U. R. Jeevarathnam as the title character and P. S. Govindan. The film was reasonably successful, but no print of it is known to survive, making it a lost film.

Cast 

U. R. Jeevarathnam as Andal
P. S. Govindan as Kannan
 'Vidwan' Sreenivasan as Vishnuchithan
 S. D. Subbaiah
 G. Sowdhamani
 Kali N. Rathnam
 S. Subbulakshmi
 'Kumari' Selvam
 P. S. Gnanam
 P. K. Madhavan
 V. M. Ezhumalai

Production 
Sri Aandal was directed by Velsamy Kavi and produced by Salem Surya Movies, a subsidiary of Modern Theatres. It was the first film for J. G. Vijayam as an independent cinematographer, while G. Srihari was the editor and Madhivannan wrote the dialogues. Sri Aandal was to have been the debut film for S. S. Rajendran as an actor. He received an offer to act in a negative role, and an advance as well. However, T. R. Sundaram, who oversaw the production, overruled Rajendran's selection because he "appeared like a boy with curly hair and was unsuitable for the villain role."

Soundtrack 
The soundtrack was composed by G. Ramanathan and the lyrics were penned by Shuddhananda Bharati. After Rajendran was unsuccessful in securing a role in the film, he pleaded with Sundaram that he could sing well. Thus Ramanathan offered him an opportunity to sing a song, which was "Inba Ulaginile Manmadha Poonganai". Sri Aandal thus marked Rajendran's singing debut.

Reception 
The film was reasonably successful, but no print of it is known to survive, making it a lost film.

References 

1940s Tamil-language films
Hindu mythological films